Ogg is a surname. Notable people with the name include:

Alan Ogg (1967–2009), American basketball player
Andrew Ogg (born 1934), American mathematician
Beverly Ogg (1937–2019), American actress known professionally as Beverly Owen
David Ogg (born 1967), Australian rules footballer
David Ogg (historian) (1887–1965), British historian
Jacques Ogg (born 1948), Dutch keyboardist on harpsichord and fortepiano
Kirsty Ogg, British curator
Steven Ogg (born 1959), Canadian actor
Sir William Gammie Ogg (1891–1979), British horticultural scientist
William L. Ogg (1937–2020), American politician
Richard N. Ogg, American airline pilot, who in 1956 ditched Pan Am Flight 6 in the Pacific Ocean with all aboard surviving

See also
Hogg (surname)
Nanny Ogg, fictional